Madeline Kenney is an American indie rock singer-songwriter based in Oakland, California.

Early life and career 
Born and raised in Seattle, Kenney started playing piano at the age of five and joined multiple bands.

In 2016, she released the extended play Signals and in 2017, she released her debut studio album Night Night at the First Landing on Company Records. Both the records were produced by Chazwick Bradley Bundick, also known as Chaz Bear or Toro y Moi. A follow-up album, Perfect Shapes, was released in October 2018, with Jenn Wasner of Wye Oak producing.

On January 22, 2021, Kenney surprise-released her EP Summer Quarter.

Discography

Studio albums

Extended plays

Singles

References 

Living people
Musicians from Oakland, California
American indie rock musicians
Year of birth missing (living people)
Singer-songwriters from California